Sigurd Abel (4 June 1837, Leonberg – 9 January 1873, Leonberg) was a German historian from Stuttgart.

Education 
Abel visited the seminary of Maulbronn and the college of Stuttgart. He then followed the steps of his cousin Heinrich Friedrich Otto Abel and began studying history in Jena, Bonn, Göttingen and Berlin. He earned his doctorate in summer 1859 with the historian Georg Waitz in Göttingen.

Career 
In 1861, Abel became a professor and private lecturer at University of Göttingen.

He was offered an extraordinary professorship from the university of Giessen in 1868.

Personal life 
In 1868, Abel's physical and mental condition forced him to return to his parental house in Leonberg, where he died in 1873.

Publications

Über den Untergang des Longobardenreiches in Italien, Göttingen 1859, thesis
Papst Hadrian I. und die weltliche Herrschaft des römischen Stuhles, Göttingen 1861
Geschichte Karls des Großen, volume I, 768-788, 1866, part of the almanac of German history published by the Historical Commission, Munich.
Das Parteiwesen in England und die Coalition zwischen Fox und North im Jahre 1783

References

Sources

 Allgemeine Deutsche Biographie - online version

1837 births
1873 deaths
People from Leonberg
Writers from Stuttgart
People from the Kingdom of Württemberg
University of Jena alumni
University of Bonn alumni
Humboldt University of Berlin alumni
University of Göttingen alumni
Academic staff of the University of Göttingen
German Lutherans
19th-century German historians
19th-century German writers
19th-century German male writers
German male non-fiction writers
19th-century Lutherans